The Beuvron is a  long river in Centre-Val de Loire, France, a left tributary of the river Loire. Its source is near the village of Coullons, southwest of Gien. The Beuvron flows generally west through the following departments and towns:

 Loiret: Cerdon
 Loir-et-Cher: Lamotte-Beuvron, Neung-sur-Beuvron, Bracieux

The Beuvron flows into the Loire at Candé-sur-Beuvron, near Chaumont-sur-Loire.

Tributaries
Néant (in Vernou-en-Sologne)
Cosson (in Candé-sur-Beuvron)

References

Rivers of France
Rivers of Centre-Val de Loire
Rivers of Loiret
Rivers of Loir-et-Cher